Kostas Papakostas (born 2 October 1948) is a Cypriot judoka. He competed at the 1980 Summer Olympics and the 1984 Summer Olympics.

References

1948 births
Living people
Cypriot male judoka
Olympic judoka of Cyprus
Judoka at the 1980 Summer Olympics
Judoka at the 1984 Summer Olympics
Place of birth missing (living people)